"We Run This" is a song by American recording artist Missy Elliott. It was written by Rhemario "Rio Beats" Webber and Elliott for her sixth studio album The Cookbook (2005), while production was handled by the former. Released as both the album's third single in the United States and the lead single from her 2006 compilation Respect M.E., it samples elements from The Sugarhill Gang version of The Shadows' song "Apache". The song peaked at number forty-eight on the Billboard Hot 100. "We Run This" was nominated for a 2007 Grammy Award for Best Rap Solo Performance. An edited version of "We Run This" was used as the theme song for the gymnastics-themed film Stick It.

Music video
The single's video features clips from the film. Dominique Dawes appeared as a gymnastics coach in the video. Missy Elliott also does some gymnastics in the video which caused her to tear her Achilles' tendon while shooting the video. The video was shot in January 2006 and released in April 2006 and received heavy airplay on television networks BET, MTV and VH1. The mini-video for another track from The Cookbook, "Bad Man" was tacked to beginning of the video. The mini-video features Elliot and her male dancers are dressed in gold band member uniforms while the female dancers are dressed in gold leotards, high-heeled boots and hats as they sing and dance in front of a cheering crowd on a football field.

Track listing
Digital download (Original)
 "We Run This" (Explicit Album Version w/o Manicure Interlude) - 3:25

Digital download (Stick It)
 "We Run This" (Stick It Edit) - 3:02
 "We Run This" (Stick It Video) - 4:14
UK CD
 "We Run This" (Explicit Album Version) - 3:25
 "Teary Eyed" (Tief Schwarz Club Remix) - 7:37

UK vinyl
 "We Run This" (Explicit Album Version) - 3:24
 "We Run This" (Instrumental) - 3:24
 "We Run This" (A cappella) - 3:23
 "Teary Eyed" (Tief Schwarz Club Remix) - 7:37

US 12" promo
 "We Run This" (Explicit Album Version) - 3:25
 "We Run This" (Amended Version) - 3:24
 "We Run This" (Instrumental) - 3:24
 "Meltdown" (Explicit Version)
 "Meltdown" (Amended Version)
 "Meltdown" (Instrumental)

Official versions
 "We Run This" (Explicit Version) / (Explicit Album Version)
 "We Run This" (Amended Version) / (Amended Album Version w/o Manicure Interlude)
 "We Run This" (Video Version)
 "We Run This" (High Contrast Remix)
 "We Run This" (Stick It Edit)
 "We Run This" (X-Press 2's Rave 'N' Bleep Mix)
 "We Run This" (X-Press 2's Rave 'N' Bleep Dub)
 "We Run This" (A Cappella)
 "We Run This" (Instrumental)

Charts

See also
2006 in music
Grammy Awards of 2007
Missy Elliott discography

References

External links
Missy Elliott's official website

2006 singles
Missy Elliott songs
Music videos directed by Dave Meyers (director)
Film theme songs
Songs written by Missy Elliott
Songs written by Jerry Lordan
Funk songs